The Oxford University Women's Lightweight Rowing Club was established in 1984 to represent the University of Oxford in the race against the Cambridge University Boat Club at the Lightweight Boat Races. Throughout the season, the Club races as Tethys Boat Club.

Membership
Membership in the rowing club is open to all female student members of the University who qualify as lightweight. Lightweight rowing for women details a maximum weight of 59 kg per athlete, with an average weight of 57 kg across the crew. This is a requirement for competition and for entry into the lightweight squad.

Facilities and training
The club trains out of the Fleming Boathouse in Wallingford, alongside the other university squads (OUBC, OUWBC, and OULRC). The club also uses the facilities at the university's Iffley Road Sports Centre.

Racing
The key race in the club's year is The Lightweight Boat Races against Cambridge on the Championship Course in London. The club also competes at national head races and regattas. In particular, the club regularly competes at the British Universities and Colleges Sport Regatta. In 2016, it won silver medal in the 8+ and bronze in the 4-. categories The club also competes at an international level, recording a latest achievement with a bronze with 4x- in  Zagreb in July 2016.

Honours

British champions

See also
 Oxford–Cambridge rivalry
 University rowing (UK)
 Women's rowing

References

External links
 OUWLRC website
 Henley Boat Races
 Henley Boat Races 2015: CUWBC Lightweights vs OUWLRC video

Rowing Club
1980s establishments in England
 
Sports clubs established in 1984
Women's rowing in the United Kingdom
Rowing clubs in Oxfordshire
Rowing clubs of the River Thames